The siege of Žepa was a three-year long siege of the small Bosnian town of Žepa which had lasted from the summer of 1992 - July 1995 during the Bosnian War. It was initially besieged by the Yugoslav People's Army (JNA) until it switched to the VRS. Throughout the siege, Žepa was part of the Srebrenica–Žepa link in eastern Bosnia. From April 1992 - February 1993, the ARBiH and the civilians of Žepa successfully resisted the Bosnian Serb army due to applying to guerrilla warfare. 

However, in March 1993, VRS general Ratko Mladić ordered the Bosnian Serb forces besieging the town to launch a large-scale counterattack. The attack resulted in the Bosnian Serbs capturing 80 percent of the territory of the Srebrenica enclave once held by the 28th Division of the ARBiH. Due to this attack, Žepa was now separated from Srebrenica and was now a complete enclave of its own.

On 16 April 1993, the United Nations Security Council Resolution 819 the Srebrenica enclave was declared a "UN safe haven". On 6 May 1993, the United Nations Security Council Resolution 824 made Žepa and other cities a "UN safe haven" under the protection of only 79 Ukrainian peacekeepers. 

On the 25 July 1995, the Bosnian Serbs, under command of general Ratko Mladić and Zdravko Tolimir, launched an offensive against the 285th Light Mountain Brigade, commanded by Avdo Palić, 14 days after the fall of Srebrenica. The offensive was called "Operation Stupčanica 95". It resulted in 750 - 1500 POW's, 800 refugees, and the deaths of 116 in the takeover.

Unlike in Srebrenica, the commander of the peacekeeping unit Mykola Verkhohlyad in negotiations with Mladić secured evacuation of civilians from Žepa in UN convoy and didn't allow them to be taken over by Serbs, which helped rescue over 10'000 muslim civilians.

NATO bombing operations continued targeting Bosnian Serb positions due to constant attacks on Sarajevo and the fall of the "UN safe havens" of Srebrenica and Žepa. The bombing operations wouldn't end until 20 September 1995 and would help the start the foundation of the Dayton Agreement.

Background 
Žepa is a small town in eastern Bosnia about 13 miles south of Srebrenica with 113 people. According to a 1991 census, 462 people lived in the village. Of whom were 450 Bosniaks (97.4%) and 12 others. It shows that more Muslims lived there than any other group or people. That January, a Bosnian Serb state was declared, ahead of the 29 February–1 March referendum on independence. Later renamed the Republika Srpska, it developed its own military as the JNA withdrew from Croatia and handed over its weapons, equipment and 55,000 troops to the newly created Bosnian Serb army. By 1 March, Bosnian Serb forces set up barricades in Sarajevo and elsewhere and later that month Bosnian Serb artillery began shelling the town of Bosanski Brod. By 4 April, Sarajevo was shelled. In May 1992, the ground forces of Bosnian Serb state officially became known as the Army of Republika Srpska (VRS). By the end of 1992, the VRS held seventy percent of Bosnia and Herzegovina.

The village Žepa was part of the much larger Rogatica municipality, though the wartime enclave itself held parts of the Srebrenica municipality. It was separated by the VRS and got attacked several times. In March 1993, the VRS launched numerous operations against the town. In March 1993, General Ratko Mladić of the VRS ordered the Bosnian Serb forces besieging the town to launch a large-scale counterattack. The attack resulted in the Bosnian Serbs capturing 80 percent of the territory of the Srebrenica enclave once held by the 28th Division of the Army of the Republic of Bosnia and Herzegovina (ARBiH). Žepa was then separated from the Srebrenica municipality.

Fall of Žepa

Operation Stupčanica 95
Operation Stupčanica 95 was the codename for the military offensive launched by the "Drina Corps" of the VRS against the 285th Light Mountain Brigade (2nd Corps). Launched on the 25 July 1995, it only took 1 day for the VRS to capture Žepa. The offensive ended the three-year long siege of the town and what followed was the deaths of 116 people, 800 refugees, and the incorporation of Žepa into Republika Srpska. The offensive was launched 14 days after the fall of Srebrenica.

Prelude 
Instead of raising all available brigades and starting a breakthrough towards Žepa or in an attack on the other side of the occupied territory of RBiH, Rasim Delić, after seeing the letter of Rama Čardaković addressed to Dr. Heljić, again wrote a letter to President Izetbegović. Delic writes:

On the 16 July 1995 at 10:05 p.m., realising that the 2nd Corps was not moving to help Žepa, Bećir Heljić and Avdo Palić wrote to Ramo Čardaković urgently requesting that attacks on the pocket be halted, exchanges of territory with the VRS and safe evacuation of the civilian population and members of the army.

On 10:25 p.m., July 17, 1995, the President of the municipality Mehmed Hajric wrote to President Alija Izetbegović demanding action. At 3 p.m. on 18 July 1995, President Izetbegović sent a letter to the head of his cabinet, Bakir Sadović, which was the reply of Hajrić in Žepa. It acknowledged the message was received and that negotiations with the VRS were ongoing, assuring help would arrive. At 3:57 p.m., not even an hour later, Hajric replied to President Izetbegović stating:

After receiving the alarming and accusatory letter from the civil and military authorities from Žepa, President Izetbegović asked Delic to make a plan for him on what, in fact, can be done for Žepa on the military front, and to give him the answer immediately! After less than an hour, Delic answered:

On 21 July 1995, Tolimir sent a report to General Radomir Miletic, acting Chief of General Staff of the Bosnian Serb Army (VRS), requesting help to crush some Bosnian military strongholds and expressing his view that "the best way to do it would be to use chemical weapons". In the same report, Tolimir went even further, proposing chemical strikes against refugee columns of women, children and elderly leaving Žepa, because that would "force the Muslim fighters to surrender quickly", in his opinion.

Evacuation of civilians 
On 22 July 1995 the commander of the Ukrainian peacekeeping unit Mykola Verkhohlyad was given order to secure evacuation of civilians from Žepa. Realizing the threat from Serbian forces who openly declared that any males aged 17 to 65 years would be "detained as prisoners of war", Verkhohlyad negotiated with Mladić and Palić and ultimately secured a deal on the evacuation being guarded by peacekeepers, with Ukrainian soldier present in every bus with civilians leaving the town. This prevented the trick used by Serbs in Srebrenica, where Dutch forces were present on the beginning and the end of the many kilometers long convoy, while the buses with civilians in the middle were quietly redirected to the execution place. As result, over  10'000 civilians from Žepa were successfully evacuated which spared them the fate of victims of Srebrenica massacre.

Offensive 
On the 25 July 1995, the offensive began. On the 26 July 1995, Mustafa Palic and Hamdija Torlak both surrendered and agreed to hand over Žepa. All other commanders, such as Avdo Palić, knowing that his men were outnumbered, outgunned and low on ammunition also sought to negotiate a withdrawal and spare the 30,000 people in Žepa the fate of the massacre victims in Srebrenica. He then got orders from Sarajevo not to surrender. On 27 July 1995, Palić went to a meeting with senior Serb and UN officials, among whom was General Ratko Mladić, the chief commander of the Bosnian Serb army. At the meeting he was seized by the Serbs. 800 refugees (Mostly women, children, and elderly) fled Žepa to Sarajevo. Mehmed Hajric, Amir Imamovic, and Avdo Palic were all brutally killed after the offensive.

NATO bombings continue 

After the fall of the UN "safe havens" of Srebrenica and Žepa and constant attacks on Sarajevo, NATO launched a sustained air campaign known as Operation Deliberate Force, which targeted Bosnian Serb positions. The campaign wouldn't end until 20 September 1995 and helped settle the foundation of the Dayton Agreement.

Role of the UN
On 16 April 1993, the United Nations Security Council Resolution 819 the Srebrenica enclave was declared a safe area. On 6 May 1993, the United Nations Security Council Resolution 824 further extended Žepa and other cities. These cities and territories were placed under the protection of the UN peacekeeping units UNPROFOR. However, when Operation Stupčanica 95 began, they only sent around 79 Ukrainian peacekeepers to Žepa.

Legacy 
On 27 July 2016, the Day of remembrance of the killed people of Žepa was established. It commemorates the fallen fighters and civilians who defended Žepa against the Bosnian Serbs.

Footnotes

References 

Bosnian War
Battles of the Bosnian War
1992 in Bosnia and Herzegovina
1995 in Bosnia and Herzegovina
Conflicts in 1992
Conflicts in 1995
July 1995 events in Europe